William Louis Wascher is an American economist and the deputy director of the Division of Research and Statistics in the Federal Reserve Board of Governors, where he has worked since 1983. He is known for his research on the economic effects of the minimum wage and aggregate supply, and is the co-author (with David Neumark) of the 2008 book Minimum Wages (MIT Press). Wascher and Neumark have also collaborated on multiple peer-reviewed studies on the employment effects of the minimum wage.

References

External links
Personal page at the Federal Reserve website

Federal Reserve economists
Living people
Labor economists
University of Delaware alumni
University of Pennsylvania alumni
21st-century American economists
Year of birth missing (living people)